The Philippine Science High School System is a research-oriented and specialized public high school system in the Philippines that operates as an attached agency of the Philippine Department of Science and Technology. PSHS is considered as the top science high school in the Philippines and is viewed to be among the best in the ASEAN region by 2016.

The PSHS System offers scholarships to Filipino students who are gifted in the sciences and mathematics. Admission to the PSHS is usually done by taking the National Competitive Examination (NCE), and only Filipino citizens are eligible to attend. Graduates of the PSHS are bound by law to major in the pure and applied sciences, mathematics, or engineering on entering college. The system is known to have a very challenging curriculum which produces the best professionals in the country.

PSHS is known for its active participation in national and international science, technology, and mathematics competitions such as Sipnayan, Kapnayan, MATHirang MATHibay, Metrobank-MTAP-DepEd Math Challenge, Philippine Mathematics, Physics, and Chemistry Olympiads, Australian Mathematics Competition and Australian Chemistry Quiz. Through private funding, students successfully reap awards in international competitions such as the Taiwan International Science and Engineering Fair, Intel International Science and Engineering Fair, International Math Olympiad, International Junior Science Olympiad, International Earth Science Olympiad, International Olympiad on Astronomy and Astrophysics, and International Physics Olympiad.

A movie was released in 2007 in honor of Philippine Science High School. Pisay got national and international recognition as it was sent to the Toronto International Film Festival. Pisay was directed by an alumnus of the school, Auraeus Solito, and was nominated for Best Documentary Feature Film at the 2008 Asia Pacific Screen Awards.

Organization

Campuses
For 24 years, the PSHS was a single campus on Agham Road, Diliman, Quezon City where the top 240 examinees in the National Competitive Examination held yearly were accepted as government scholars. All campuses have at most 30 students in each class. The main campus has eight classes per batch while the regional campuses have three classes per batch. Currently, each region in the Philippines except the Bangsamoro has a campus.

System organization
The Board of Trustees (BOT) is the highest policy making body of the PSHS System. The executive committee (ExeCom), composed of the directors of different PSHS campuses, is a collegial body that recommends policies and guidelines for the consideration of the BOT. The executive committee is chaired by the executive director, who coordinates the implementation of these policies and guidelines. PSHS campuses are headed by directors who are members of the ExeCom.

History

Establishment and early years 
The Philippine Science High School was established through Republic Act 3661, authored by Congressman Virgilio Afable, and signed into law in 1963 by President Diosdado Macapagal. This charter mandates the PSHS “to offer on a free scholarship basis a secondary course with emphasis on subjects pertaining to service with the end in view of preparing its students for a science career”. The school started operations in 1964.

National scientist Dr. Gregorio Velasquez led the PSHS through its first three years. The campus started in a small rented GSIS-owned property along the Quezon Memorial Circle. In 1970 PSHS started building on a 75,000 square metre lot along Agham Road in Diliman, Quezon City.

Expansion and establishment of the PSHS System 
By the end of the 1980s, PSHS started to spread across the nation. The first regional campuses were built, starting with the Mindanao Campus (now Southern Mindanao Campus), in Davao City, in 1988.

The PSHS System Law (R.A. 8496) was signed by President Fidel V. Ramos in 1997 that established the PSHS System and unified all the existing campuses into a single system of governance and management. Thus, the PSHS continues fulfilling its mandate “to offer, on a free scholarship basis, a secondary course with special emphasis on subjects pertaining to the sciences, with the end view of preparing its students for a science career”.

Admissions
Admission into any campus of the system can be done through the national competitive exam, lateral admission, or intercampus transfer.

National Competitive Examination (NCE)
Sixth graders can be admitted into any campus of PSHSS through the Philippine Science High School’s National Competitive Examination (NCE) which is held only once every year. A grade 6 elementary pupil from a duly recognized school by the Department of Education is eligible to apply for the Philippine Science High School’s National Competitive Examination (NCE) if he/she meets the specific criteria.

Lateral Admission – Qualifying Exam
Admission can also be done through lateral admission. A student who has finished Grade 7/Grade 8 (under the high school curriculum or the new K-12 curriculum) outside of the Philippine Science High School System may be allowed admission into PSHS-BRC if specific requirements are met.

Intercampus Transfer
Scholars of the system may travel to other campuses of the system. Intercampus transfer will only be allowed to incoming Grade 8, 9, or 10 students from a PSHSS campus and approval depends on the slots available in the desired campus to be transferred to. The transferring student must meet certain requirements in order to be considered eligible to transfer.

Notable alumni
 Reynaldo Vea  (Batch 1969): President, Chief Executive Officer & Board Director of Mapua University 
 Mario Taguiwalo (Batch 1969): Former Undersecretary of Health, consultant to peace talks with the NDF (Aquino presidency), film and stage actor, co-lyricist with Lyncir Lagunzad (Batch 1971-A) of the PSHS Hymn. Eisenhower Fellow (1989).
 Vicky Tauli-Corpuz (Batch 1969): Indigenous People's rights advocate; Chair, United Nations Permanent Forum on Indigenous Issues
 Cielito Habito (Batch 1970): former Director General of the National Economic and Development Authority
 Hermogenes Esperon (Batch 1970): General; Chief of Staff, Armed Forces of the Philippines
 Butch Dalisay (Batch 1971-A): writer, editor, columnist, Palanca awardee
 Bobby Lopez Castro (Batch 1971-B): Co-Founder, President and CEO of Palawan Pawnshop Group-Palawan Express Pera Padala
 Angelita Maligalig-Castro (Batch 1971-B): Co-Founder, Palawan Pawnshop Group-Palawan Express Pera Padala
 Joel Navarro (Batch 1971-B): award-winning conductor, singer-composer (Swerte-Swerte Lang), arranger, music professor, and stage actor. Gawad Lagablad Awardee, 1991.
 Anna Bayle (Batch 1974): entrepreneur and Asia's first international supermodel
 Miriam Coronel-Ferrer (Batch 1977): peace negotiator and the former chair of the peace panel of the Government of the Philippines 
 Jessica Zafra (Batch 1982): fiction writer, columnist, editor, publisher, former television and radio show host, Palanca awardee
 Joseph Emilio Abaya (Batch 1983): former Congressman, 1st district of Cavite, Secretary, Department of Transportation and Communication
 Auraeus Solito (aka Kanakan Balintagos) (Batch 1986): filmmaker, director of the internationally acclaimed "Ang Pagdadalaga ni Maximo Oliveros", "Tuli", "Pisay", "Busong: Palawan Fate", and "Baybayin: The Palawan Script"
 Barry Gutierrez (Batch 1990): former Congressman, spokesperson of former Vice President Leni Robredo
 Luis Katigbak (Batch 1991): writer and music critic
 Karlo Nograles (Batch 1993): Chairman Civil Service Commission
 Jeffrey Hidalgo (Batch 1994): singer, songwriter, former band member of Smokey Mountain group
 Ricardo Novenario (Batch 1996): writer of award-winning 'Ang Huling El Bimbo' and 'Kafatiran' plays.
 Atom Araullo (Batch 2000): television host, reporter and newscaster now with GMA Network.

References

External links

PSHS System official website
PSHS Foundation, Inc.
PSHS National Alumni Association

 
Department of Science and Technology (Philippines)